Fatherland War may refer to:
 First Fatherland War, the French invasion of Russia in 1812
 Second Fatherland War, an occasional reference to the Eastern Front (World War I) in Russian sources
 Fatherland Liberation War, the Korean War